Sandi Čeh (born 6 April 1983) is a Slovenian  football defender who plays for SV Deutsch Goritz.

References

External links
NZS profile 
Nogomania profile 

1983 births
Living people
People from Ptuj
Slovenian footballers
Association football fullbacks
NK Aluminij players
NK Zavrč players
Slovenian PrvaLiga players
Slovenian expatriate footballers
Expatriate footballers in Austria
Slovenian expatriate sportspeople in Austria